National Highway 109 (NH 109), (Previously NH 87), is a highway in India which runs in the Indian state of Uttarakhand. It is one of the most important routes, connecting the entire Kumaon region to the state as well as the country. It is also the major route towards the hill stations such as Nainital, Kausani, Ranikhet, Mukteswar and Almora from Delhi. Previously known as NH 87, it was renumbered as NH 109 in 2010. The northern terminal is at NH 7 near Karnaprayag and the southern terminal is at National Highway 9 near Rudrapur. More than 10,000 vehicles travel through NH-109 in tourist season.

Route
The Highway Starts from its Junction with NH 9 and connecting the cities of Rudrapur, Pantnagar, Haldwani, Kathgodam, Nainital, Bhowali, Almora, Ranikhet, Dwarahat, Chaukhutia, Gairsain and Adi Badri, terminates with its junction with NH 7 near Karnaprayag. It runs for a distance of 284 km in the districts of Udham Singh Nagar, Nainital, Almora in Kumaon and Chamoli in Garhwal of the Indian state of Uttarakhand.

Intersections

See also
 List of National Highways in India (by Highway Number)
 List of National Highways in India
 National Highways Development Project

References

External links 
NH 109 on OpenStreetMap

National Highways in Uttarakhand
National highways in India